Dausuva, also known as Atsarginė Lietuva or Žalioji atžala, is a geopolitical concept devised in the 20th century by Lithuanian interwar thinker Kazys Pakštas, which sought to create a Lithuanian colony overseas. It was named after Dausos — a spirit world in Lithuanian mythology.

Events 
This semi-independent state was thought to serve as a safe haven for Lithuanians if the Republic of Lithuania would be occupied. Pakštas believed that because of the tensions between Nazi Germany and Soviet Russia at the time, Lithuania would eventually be occupied by either of them and face assimilation by force. “It is obvious to me that one of those countries will occupy Lithuania. And since both of these neighbours are totalitarian regimes, the wealth and people of Lithuania will be exterminated with brutality, which is unheard of. Not only will they [the people] be robbed, but also spiritual fortunes will be destroyed with great rage, and there will be attempts to eliminate every beam of Lithuanian spirituality and creativity” — Kazys Pakštas.He also feared that the chaotic and non-directional mass emigration of Lithuanians to the West following the First World War also posed a great threat to the survival of the nation as they were destined to assimilate with other cultures. Pakštas called for the planning and regulation of this migration with the intent to form a colony where Lithuanians would constitute the majority of the population, thus eliminating the threat of the nation's demise.

In 1924, Pakštas considered Quebec to be the best location for such a colony. Later his attention switched to the state of São Paulo in Brazil (1927), Angola (1930) and Madagascar. Efforts to establish a colony in Venezuela were abandoned due to the unstable political situation there. It was finally decided to establish the colony in British Honduras. Meetings to set a land purchase or lease deal with local authorities in the territory were held. However, due to the rise of an independence movement in British Honduras, this location was abandoned as well. The last considered location for Dausuva were the Bahamas, but support for the project was getting weaker and it was never realized.

Cultural references 
This theory was featured in the three-part play Madagascar, written by Lithuanian playwright Marius Ivaškevičius. The concept also inspired the making of the 2019 period drama film Nova Lituania, created by writer-director Karolis Kaupinis.

References

History of Lithuania (1918–1940)
History of British Honduras
Intentional communities